Berks Area Regional Transportation Authority (BARTA), previously Berks Area Reading Transportation Authority, is a public transportation system serving the city of Reading and its surrounding area of Berks County, Pennsylvania. The South Central Transit Authority owns BARTA and the Red Rose Transit Authority (RRTA).

History 
BARTA was created with the cooperation of the Berks County and the City of Reading in 1973 to purchase the failing Reading Bus Company. On October 8, 1973, BARTA began bus operations. The BARTA Special Services paratransit service was formed in 1978 when 33 social service agencies in Berks County consolidated their transportation systems. In 1992, BARTA became the first small public transit agency in the United States to use Compressed Natural Gas (CNG) buses. A grant from the Federal Transit Administration in 1993 allowed BARTA to eliminate the pedestrian mall along Penn Street in downtown Reading and reopen the road to traffic. As part of this, Penn Street between 4th and 6th streets was restored and bus shelters and berths were built. The BARTA Transportation Center at 7th and Cherry streets opened in 2002 to serve as a hub for BARTA buses. In 2005, the BARTA Park-N-Transit garage with 350 parking spaces opened at 7th and Franklin streets. The same year, a new logo for BARTA and paint scheme for buses was introduced. The agency also started investing in electric-diesel hybrid buses. In 2010, BARTA became a county authority, overseen by the County of Berks, reflecting its focus on regionalism instead of centralism on the city of Reading. The former Reading Railroad Franklin Street Station was refurbished and reopened to bus service on September 9, 2013.

In September 2013, BARTA expanded its service on a trial basis to Lebanon with connecting service on Lebanon Transit to Harrisburg.  This service replaced previously abandoned coach service operated by Bieber Tourways, on July 1, 2013.  However, BARTA discontinued its service to Lebanon on January 31, 2014, due to low ridership.

Dennis D. Louwerse, the long-time executive director/CEO at BARTA, died on Thursday, September 5, 2013, at the age of 68. He became the executive director at BARTA in 1983, and he was the executive director for 30 years until his death. David W. Kilmer is currently the executive director. On December 1, 2014, the South Central Transit Authority was formed to oversee BARTA and the Red Rose Transit Authority (RRTA) in Lancaster County.

Current routes 

BARTA operates most of its present route network on a hub and spoke type system, in which most passengers transfer between routes at a central location, the BARTA Transportation Center.

Fares 
The base cash fare to ride on BARTA buses is $1.70. Certain routes have an additional zone fare of $0.25 for travel outside the base zone. Transfers from one route to another are available for $0.25 and must be used within two hours of being issued. Students in grades 1-12 may ride for $1.20 with a Student ID card. Medicare Card holders and disabled people with proper ID may ride BARTA for $0.85. Senior citizens may ride BARTA for free with proper ID. Up to three children age 5 and under may ride for free with a fare-paying adult.

BARTA offers various discount fares and passes for riders. Ten Trip Tickets provide ten bus trips and cost $17.30 for Adult Anywhere and $11.00 for Student Anywhere. The One Day Pass provides unlimited rides in a single day and costs $3.00 if purchased in advance and $4.00 if purchased on board the bus. The 31 Day Pass provides unlimited rides in a 31-day period and costs $47.00 for Adult Anywhere and $29.00 for Student Anywhere. The 31 Day Park-N-Ride Pass is valid for rides in a 31-day period to and from park and ride lots only and costs $31.00.

Transit facilities

BARTA Transportation Center 
The BARTA Transportation Center is located at 7th and Cherry streets in Downtown Reading and is where all BARTA bus routes connect. The transportation center has an enclosed waiting area, restrooms, customer service office, a break area for bus drivers, a community police station, and a 101-space parking garage. The BARTA Transportation Center has ten berths that the buses stop at and announces arriving and departing buses over the PA system and through information displays in the waiting and loading areas.

Franklin Street Station 

The former Reading Railroad Franklin Street Station was refurbished and also has bus service. The station has a waiting area for passengers, customer service area, transportation museum, and space for passenger amenities. The station is intended to be used for future express and long-distance bus services.

Park and ride locations 
BARTA operates five park and ride lots across Berks County:
FirstEnergy Stadium (Route 19)
Redner's in Hamburg (Route 20)
Redner's in Leesport (Route 20)
Shelbourne Square in Exeter Township (Route 8)
Womelsdorf (Route 14)

BARTA's fleet 
BARTA's fleet consists of 50 buses, consisting primarily of hybrid electric buses, which include Gillig BRT hybrids and Gillig Low Floor Plus hybrids. BARTA's fixed route fleet was mostly buses powered by Detroit Diesel engines until the production of the Detroit Diesel Series 50 was cut in late 2004. Then BARTA ordered their 05, 07, 08 and 09 Gillig BRTs with Cummins ISL. The first 2 digits of the bus numbers indicate the year the bus was ordered. All of BARTA's buses from 2010 and earlier are equipped with Allison, and all of them have Bendix air brakes. , BARTA has received Gillig BRT hybrids with Cummins ISB, Cummins ISB6.7 and Cummins B6.7 engines. In 2009 and 2010, BARTA received 9 Gillig BRT hybrids with the Allison  EP-40 hybrid drive system. , BARTA has received additional Gillig BRT hybrids, which are series hybrids equipped with BAE Systems HybriDrive Series-E. Fewer passengers have been riding the bus due to COVID-19 so there are fewer active buses in the fleet.

Current fleet

Paratransit 

The BARTA Special Services Division provides Shared Ride bus service offering consolidated trips between customers’ origins and destinations that are not well served by fixed route bus service. Often referred to as “Paratransit,” Shared Ride operates during limited hours and specific travel areas.

Current fleet

References

External links 
 BARTAs official website
 BARTA photo gallery

Bus transportation in Pennsylvania
Intermodal transportation authorities in the United States
Municipal authorities in Pennsylvania
Transportation in Berks County, Pennsylvania
Paratransit services in the United States